Kozioł or Koziol may refer to:

Places
 Kozioł, Lublin Voivodeship (east Poland)
 Kozioł, Podlaskie Voivodeship (north-east Poland)

Other uses
 Kozioł (bagpipe), a family of bagpipes played in Poland
 Kozioł (surname)

See also
 
 Kozieł (south-west Poland)